Deer River is a hamlet in the town of Denmark, Lewis County, New York, United States. Deer River had a post office from September 19, 1845, until June 4, 1994; it still has its own ZIP code, 13627.

References

Hamlets in Lewis County, New York
Hamlets in New York (state)